Myosotis scorpioides (syn. Myosotis palustris), the true forget-me-not or water forget-me-not, is a herbaceous perennial  flowering plant in the borage family, Boraginaceae.

Distribution and habitat 
It is native to Europe and Asia, but is widely distributed elsewhere, including much of North America, as an introduced species and sometimes a noxious weed. The plant is common and widespread in Britain, however is very rare in Jersey.

The plant is usually found in damp or wet habitats, such as bogs, ponds, streams, ditches, fen and rivers.  Whilst it favours wet ground, it can survive submerged in water, and often can form floating rafts.

Description 
It is an erect to ascending plant of up to 70 cm, bearing small (8-12 mm) flowers pink in bud, becoming blue when fully open, with yellow centers and white honey guides. The plant is distinguished by its long style. The leaves are oblong to linear and pubescent on both sides.  It blooms from mid-spring to first frost in temperate climates.

Myosotis scorpioides is also known as scorpion grass due to the spiraling curve of its inflorescence on scorpioid cymes.

Gallery

References

External links
Jepson Manual Treatment
Connecticut Botanical Society
Photo gallery

scorpioides
Plants described in 1753
Taxa named by Carl Linnaeus